The Battle of Mărăști was one of the main battles to take place on Romanian soil in World War I. It was fought between 22 July and 1 August 1917, and was an offensive operation of the Romanian and Russian armies intended to encircle and destroy the German 9th Army. The operation was planned to occur in tandem with the Nămoloasa offensive; however, this operation was abandoned before it began.

Background
Mărăști, just like Mărășești, is part of the strategically important Focșani Gate, the control of which eases attacks into several Romanian regions.

The opposing forces
At the beginning of July, based on the campaign plan drawn up in May by the High Command, final instructions were given to the 1st and 2nd Romanian Armies. The 1st Army was to carry out the principal attack around Nămoloasa and then, on terrain prepared by the latter, the 2nd Army, commanded by General Alexandru Averescu, was to carry out a second-order attack toward Mărăști. The objective of the operation – the retaking of enemy positions from the Poiana Încărcătoarea–Răcoasa sector — was contained in Operations Order Nr. 1638.

Altogether the opposing sides were rather evenly matched, although the Romanian High Command had massed additional forces along the direction of the attacks planned for the 2nd Army, thus creating a more advantageous force equilibrium for Romania.

The combat units were as follows:

The 2nd Romanian Army had the following battle formations:
1st Order
4th Army Corps - commanded by General Gheorghe Văleanu
8th Infantry Division
11th Brigade from the 6th Infantry Division
In reserve:
6th Infantry Division less the 11th Brigade
10th Vânători Regiment
3rd Battalion from the 24th Infantry Regiment
2nd Army Corps – commanded by General Artur Văitoianu
6th Infantry Division less the 11th Brigade from the 4th Reserve Corps
3rd Infantry Division
2nd Order
1st Infantry Division less the 18th Regiment 
2 mountain artillery divisions 
1 heavy artillery division (152 mm)
7 long cannon batteries and shell launchers

The Gerok Group contained:
Ruiz Group
1 cavalry division 
1 infantry division
8th Army Group
1 mountain brigade – the 8th Austro-Hungarian brigade reinforced with 2 battalions from the 71st Austro-Hungarian infantry division
1 cavalry brigade 
2 infantry divisions
In reserve:
The 7th Austro-Hungarian cavalry division.

The ratio of forces was as follows:

In the summer of 1917, one of the largest concentrations of forces in the First World War was located in Romania: 9 armies, 80 infantry and 19 cavalry divisions, totalling 974 battalions, 550 squadrons and 923 artillery batteries. 800,000 combatants and 1,000,000 reservists were present.

Situation on the front

When the operation began the situation on the Mărăști-Nămoloasa front was as follows: the 2nd Romanian Army was positioned between Arșița Mocanului hill and the commune of Răcoasa. The 9th Russian Army was on its right flank and the 4th Russian Army on its left flank. Facing the Romanians was the right flank of the First Austro-Hungarian Army; more specifically, these were elements of the Gerok Group. The main Austro-Hungarian forces were placed between Momâia hill and Arșița Mocanului hill. Again, each division covered 12 km of the front.

Preparations for battle
The Romanian order for battle provided for the principal offensive to unfold in three phases. The first phase envisioned breaking through the enemy defenses between Încărcătoarea clearing and the village of Mărăști with the aim of taking Teiuș Hill. The 3rd Infantry Division and right-flank forces of the 6th Infantry Division were selected to break through, after which they were to hold the Încărcătoarea clearing–Câmpuri–Vizantea Mânăstirească–Găurile line. If needed, second-order troops could be sent in. In the second phase, the 4th Army Corps was to join the fight by starting a left-flank offensive towards the Coada Văii–Babei clearing. To the south, the advance was to take place in cooperation with the 4th Russian Army's right flank and with the aid of the 2nd Romanian Army, its objective being to reach the Coada Văii–Babei clearing–Rotilești–Teiuș Hill–Valea Teiușului line. The third planned phase envisioned the front shifting to the Sboina Neagră Peak hills to the north of Lepșa, north of the Putna River–Valea Sării line. The enemy commanders were informed about the Allied armies' operations, but thought they had the ability to repulse their offensive and even to launch a counterattack.

The German and Austro-Hungarian units' defensive works were of two kinds: the first consisted of resistance centres connected by a network of redoubts and trenches, protected by various obstacles and covered by artillery and machine-gun fire; at essential points, these resistance centres had steel domes, labyrinths of redoubts that facilitated communication and firing, artillery platforms, machine-gun alcoves, and shelters for personnel and munitions. The centres were connected by well-maintained, well-placed trenches that allowed the troops to keep fighting even when encircled. The subterranean defensive lines were poorly developed; moreover, the first line of defense was spread out over uncovered terrain and lacked strong forward posts. This allowed Romanian Army ground patrols as well as the Air Corps to easily identify these positions. Another disadvantage of those lines of defense, which was successfully exploited by the Romanian Army, was the difficult terrain in front of the lines, which allowed numerous groups of Romanian troops to hide therein and carry out swift bayonet attacks or decisive assaults.

Before ground troops made their assault, the Romanian artillery had a decisive role in the success of the operation. Divisional artillery attacked, destroyed and disorganized the enemy's military engineers' works in the first line of defense and created breaches in the barbed wire fences. The army corps artillery had an anti-artillery mission, destroying enemy batteries. The preparatory work of the artillery took place between 22 July at 12 noon until the next day at 8 pm. The efficiency of this work was much appreciated by the Romanian officers, and was continually monitored by the front-rank troops. The 2nd Army Command thus decided, through Order Nr. 1908, to launch the ground assault on 24 July at 4 am.

Aftermath
The offensive was stopped because the Allied Command had to adjust its initial plans. The new plan moved the 9th Russian Army from the Western Moldavian front to the Northern front to stop the successful offensive of the 3rd and 7th Austro-Hungarian Armies from Bukovina, which started on 19 July. Moreover, the 1st and 2nd Romanian Armies, along with the 4th Russian Army, had to expand their area of responsibility to compensate for the withdrawal of the 9th Russian Army.

The Battle of Mărăști represented an important turning point in the evolution of the military operations on the Romanian Front, also raising the morale of Romanian troops. Reorganised and thoroughly trained, having experienced the 1916 campaign, Romanian troops showed themselves to be an adversary capable of posing a problem for, and even defeating the renowned German and Austro-Hungarian armies. The result of this battle was due not only to the tactical abilities of both the Romanian officers and of the Romanian artillerymen, and their good collaboration with ground troops, as well as the determination and tenacity in battle of Romanian soldiers, but also to the precious aid given by locals, who provided intelligence about the enemy and guided Romanian troops along mountain paths toward the enemy flanks and even behind their lines.

The results of the offensive can be summarized as follows:
The Romanian-Russian forces took 2,700 prisoners, 70 guns, and important quantities of matériel, including a significant amount of munitions;
32 Class III Order of Mihai Viteazul medals were awarded to Romanian officers. The flags of four regiments (4th, 18th, 30th Infantry and 2nd Vânători) were decorated with the same distinction, while a Class II Order of Mihai Viteazul medal was bestowed upon General Averescu.

Archduke Joseph made a report identifying and presenting the principal causes for his defeat at Mărăști:
"An admirable cooperation between artillery, infantry and aviation in breaking through our lines and preparing the assault; their planes flew undisturbed by the firing of our artillery." "The mine-throwers performed excellently in places where we passed through."
"The exhaustion of our retreating troops on a difficult terrain."
The Romanian Army "continuously changed its first-rank troops, who were led away by the inhabitants to their villages."

During the Battle of Mărăști, the highest average rate of offensive actions by Allied troops in the European theatre in 1917 was achieved, as shown by the following table.

The Romanian victory strongly affected the public opinion, as illustrated by reactions of the press: a few days after the battle was over, The Times wrote: "The only point of light in the East is to be found in Romania, where the rebuilt army is vigorously attacking the Carpathian lines, obtaining notable successes." The French Minister of War used the same tone to describe the Romanian victory: "The French Army has learned with joy of the beautiful successes of the Romanian Army (...) Please send my warmest congratulations and the most hearty good wishes of the French soldiers to their brothers in arms."

The success of this offensive caused Field Marshal von Mackensen to move a significant part of the 9th German Army from Nămoloasa towards Focșani. This caused the 9th German Army to alter its offensive direction, thus reducing pressure along the Nămoloasa front. Furthermore, a breach that could be further opened had been created in the German lines; a basis now existed from which the Allied armies could greatly expand their future offensive operations on the Romanian Front.

The Mărăști Mausoleum
 
In order to honour the memory of the heroes of Mărăști and to keep alive a recollection of the fighting that occurred there, the cornerstone of the Mărăști Mausoleum was laid in a ceremony on 10 June 1928. The mausoleum was built at an altitude of 536 m (where some of the heaviest fighting took place) through the initiative of a group of officers and generals who were part of the Mărăști Society in the commune of Răcoasa, village of Mărăști. Above the entrance gate to the mausoleum grounds there is a sign that reads, "The historic battlefield of Mărăști". The architect Pandele Șerbănescu designed the mausoleum, with bas-reliefs executed by Aurel Bordenache. The pillars are amply decorated with bronze bas-reliefs that depict a Romanian peasant crossing the front with information about the enemy, and the reception given to a Romanian general by the inhabitants of Marăști. Between the two pillars, on a concrete wall, there are thirteen white marble slabs inscribed with the names of over 900 Romanian troops who fell in battle. In the basement there are soldiers' ossuaries as well as crypts for the officers who fell in battle.

The Mausoleum, open Tuesday through Sunday from 9 am to 5 pm, can be reached by the Focșani–Soveja county highway.

See also
 Romania during World War I
 Kerensky Offensive (1 July to 19 July 1917)
 Battle of Mărășești (6 August to 8 September 1917)

References

Bibliography
 România în anii primului război mondial, vol. 2, Editura Militară, Bucharest, 1987
 Istoria Militară a Poporului Român, vol. 5, Editura Militară, Bucharest, 1988
 Cupșa, Ion. Mărăști, Mărășești, Oituz, Editura Militară, 1967

External links
 Mausoleul Mărăști
 Mărăști Mausoleum 
 Austrian and Hungarian field commanders of WWI

Battles of World War I involving Austria-Hungary
Battles of World War I involving Germany
Battles of World War I involving Romania
Battles of World War I involving Russia
History of Western Moldavia
Conflicts in 1917
1917 in Romania
July 1917 events
August 1917 events